This is a list of notable Ecuadorians. This list needs to be edited. See Presidents section.

Arts

Literature and journalism

 Carmen Acevedo Vega (1913–2006) - poet and writer
 Jorge Enrique Adoum (1926–2009) - poet and novelist
 Luis Aguilar-Monsalve (b. 1942) - writer
 Demetrio Aguilera Malta (1909–1981) - writer
 Gabriela Alemán (b. 1968) - novelist and short story writer
 Carlos Altamirano Sánchez (b. 1926) - poet and journalist
 Vicente Amador Flor (1903–1975) - poet
 María Fernanda Ampuero (b. 1976) - journalist, short story writer
 Juan Andrade Heymann (b. 1945) - novelist, poet, playwright, short story writer
 Raúl Andrade Moscoso (1905–1983) - journalist and playwright
 César E. Arroyo (1887–1937) - poet, novelist, journalist, playwright and diplomat
 Enrique Avellán Ferrés (1904–1984) - novelist and playwright
 Juan Bautista Aguirre (1725–1786) - poet and writer from colonial South America
 Pablo Balarezo Moncayo (1904–1999) - writer, journalist
 Alfonso Barrera Valverde (1929–2013) - writer, diplomat
 Ana Cecilia Blum (b. 1972) - writer
 Arturo Borja (1892–1912) - poet
 Luz Elisa Borja (1903-1927) - poet
 Rosa Borja de Ycaza (1889–1964) - poet and essayist
 Vicente Cabrera Funes (1944–2014) - writer
 Jorge Luis Cáceres (b. 1982) - writer, editor
 Oswaldo Calisto Rivera (1979–2000) - poet and artist
 José Antonio Campos (1868–1939) - journalist
 Eliécer Cárdenas (1950–2021) - novelist
 Hipatia Cárdenas de Bustamante (1889–1972) - writer, suffragist
 Jorge Carrera Andrade (1903–1978) - poet
 Alejandro Carrión Aguirre (1915–1992) - writer and journalist
 Fanny Carrión de Fierro (b. 1939) - writer, poet, essayist and professor
 Benjamín Carrión Mora (1897–1979) - writer
 Iván Carvajal (b. 1948) - poet, philosopher, writer
 María Piedad Castillo de Levi (1888–1962) - journalist, suffragist
 Gabriel Cevallos García (1913–2004) - writer and historian
 Octavio Cordero Palacios (1870–1930) - writer, playwright, poet, mathematician, lawyer, professor and inventor
 Simón Corral (b. 1946) - poet and playwright
 Mary Corylé (1894–1976) - poet
 Luis Alberto Costales (1926–2006) - poet, philosopher, writer, professor and politician
 Remigio Crespo Toral (1860–1939) - poet, journalist, politician
 José de la Cuadra (1903–1941) - novelist and short story writer
 Agustin Cueva (1937–1992) - writer and sociologist
 César Dávila Andrade (1918–1967)- poet
 Jorge Dávila Vázquez (b. 1947) - writer
 Rafael Díaz Ycaza (1925–2013) - poet, novelist, and short story writer
 Miguel Donoso Pareja (1931–2015) - poet, novelist, and short story writer
 José María Egas (1896–1982) - poet
 Gonzalo Escudero (1903–1971) - poet and diplomat
 Eugenio Espejo (1747–1795) - writer
 Ileana Espinel (1933–2001) - poet
 Aurelio Espinosa Pólit (1894–1961) - writer, poet, and translator
 Alfonso Espinosa de los Monteros (b. 1941) - TV journalist, holder of a Guinness Record for longest continuous time as a news anchor.
 Jenny Estrada (b. 1940) - writer and journalist
 Ulises Estrella (1939–2014) - poet, film expert
 Nelson Estupiñán Bass (1912–2002) - poet
 Jacinto de Evia (1625–1700s) - poet, priest
 Ángel Felicísimo Rojas (1909–2003) - writer, novelist, and poet
 Humberto Fierro (1890–1929) - poet
 Luis Enrique Fierro (b. 1936) - poet and medical doctor
 Jaime Galarza Zavala (b. 1930) - writer, poet, journalist and politician
 Joaquín Gallegos Lara (1909–1947) - novelist and short story writer
 Karina Galvez (b. 1964) - poet
 Alfredo Gangotena (1904–1944) - poet who wrote in French and Spanish
 Enrique Gil Gilbert (1912–1973) - writer
 Federico González Suárez (1844–1917) - bishop, historian
 Euler Granda (1935–2018) - novelist
 Francisco Granizo Ribadeneira (1925–2009) - poet
 Yanna Hadatty (b. 1969) - short story writer and essayist
 Horacio Hidrovo Peñaherrera (1931–2012) - poet and writer
 Horacio Hidrovo Velásquez (1902–1962) - poet, novelist and short story writer
 Janet Hinostroza (b. 1971) - journalist and TV presenter
 Gilda Holst (b. 1952) - writer
 Jorge Icaza Coronel (1906–1978) - writer
 María Angélica Idrobo (1890–1956) - writer, educator
 Edna Iturralde (b. 1948) - writer
 Efraín Jara Idrovo (1926–2018) - poet and writer
 Carlos Eduardo Jaramillo Castillo (b. 1932) - poet
 Nicolás Kingman Riofrío (1918–2018) - journalist, writer and politician
 Juan Larrea Holguín (1927–2006) - writer and lawyer
 Numa Pompilio Llona (1832–1907) - poet
 Sonia Manzano Vela (b. 1947) - writer and pianist
 Luis A. Martínez (1869–1909) - novelist
 Nela Martínez (1912–2004) - writer
 José Martínez Queirolo (1931–2008) - playwright
 Hugo Mayo (1895–1988) - poet and writer
 José Trajano Mera (1862–1919) - poet and playwright
 Juan León Mera (1832–1894) - writer
 Pedro Moncayo (1807–1888) - political journalist
 Juan Montalvo (1832–1889) - writer
 Ernesto Noboa y Caamaño (1889–1927) - poet
 Jorge Núñez Sánchez (1947–2020) - writer
 José Joaquín de Olmedo (1780–1847) - poet, politician
 Adalberto Ortiz (1914–2003) - writer and poet
 Emilio Palacio (b. 1954) - journalist
 Alfredo Pareja Diezcanseco (1908–1993) - writer
 Julio Pazos Barrera (b. 1944) - poet and writer
 Galo René Pérez (1923–2008) - biographer, poet, and essayist
 Jorge Pérez Concha (1908–1995) - writer and historian
 Ismael Pérez Pazmiño (1876–1944) - journalist, businessman
 Rodolfo Pérez Pimentel (b. 1939) - biographer
 Aleyda Quevedo (b. 1972) - writer
 Ernesto Quiñonez (b. 1969) - novelist 
 Edmundo Ribadeneira Meneses (1920–2004) - writer
 Víctor Manuel Rendón (1859–1940) - writer
 Óscar Efrén Reyes (1896–1966)
 Miguel Riofrío (1822–1879) - writer
 Juan Manuel Rodríguez (b. 1945) - Spanish-Ecuadorian writer
 Alfonso Rumazo González (1903–2002) - writer, historian, essayist and literary critic
 José Rumazo González (b. 1904) - poet
 Hugo Salazar Tamariz (1923–1999) - poet, novelist and playwright
 Natasha Salguero (b. 1952) - writer, journalist
 Isacovici Salomon (1924–1998) - writer
 Filoteo Samaniego (1928–2013) - novelist, poet, historian, translator, and diplomat
 Medardo Ángel Silva (1898–1919) - poet
 Dolores Sucre (1837-1917) - poet
 Fernando Tinajero (b. 1940) - writer
 Francisco Tobar García (1928–1997) - poet, novelist, and playwright
 Abdón Ubidia (b. 1944) - novelist
 Zoila Ugarte de Landívar (1864–1969) - journalist
 Benjamín Urrutia (b. 1950) - writer
 Juan Valdano Morejón (1939-2021) - writer
 Leonardo Valencia (b. 1969) - writer
 Eduardo Varas (b. 1979) - novelist and journalist
 Fray José María Vargas O.P. (1902–1988) - writer and historian
 Javier Vásconez (b. 1946) - novelist and short story writer
 Marieta de Veintemilla (1855–1907) - writer, politician
 Dolores Veintimilla (1829–1857) - poet
 Juan de Velasco (1727–1792) - poet, historian
 Jorge Velasco Mackenzie (1949–2021) - writer
 Pedro Jorge Vera (1914–1999) - writer
 Raquel Verdesoto (1910–1999) - poet, biographer, teacher, feminist activist
 Gaspar de Villarroel (1587–1665) - bishop, apologist
 Humberto Vinueza (1942–2017) - poet
 Alicia Yánez Cossío (b. 1928) - novelist
 Gonzalo Zaldumbide (1884–1965) - poet

Visual arts

 Alfredo Palacio Moreno - sculptor
 Aníbal Villacís - painter
 Araceli Gilbert - painter
 Bernardo de Legarda - sculptor
 Caesar Andrade Faini - painter
 Camilo Egas - painter
 Eduardo Kingman - painter
 Enrique Tábara - painter
 Estuardo Maldonado - sculptor and painter
 Félix Arauz - painter
 Galo Galecio - painter
 Gonzalo Amancha - painter
 Gonzalo Endara Crow - painter
 Hugo Cifuentes - photographer and painter
 Joaquín Pinto - painter
 Jorge Velarde - painter
 Jorge Swett - muralist, painter, lawyer and writer
 Juan Villafuerte - painter
 Judith Gutierrez - painter
 Leonardo Tejada - painter
 Luigi Stornaiolo Pimentel - painter
 Luis Miranda - painter
 Luis Molinari - painter
 Manuel Rendón - painter
 Marcos Restrepo - printer
 Miguel Betancourt - painter
 Oswaldo Guayasamín - painter
 Oswaldo Moreno - painter
 Oswaldo Viteri - painter
 Patricio Cueva Jaramillo - painter
 Ramón Piaguaje - painter
 Theo Constanté - painter
 Washington Iza - painter
Jaime Andrade Moscoso - sculptor

Dance
 Frederick Ashton - Ecuadorian born British ballet dancer and choreographer
 Noralma Vera - Director of the National Dance Institute (Instituto Nacional de Danza)
 Esperanza Cruz Hidalgo - ballerina

Theater, TV and film
 Ernesto Albán - vaudeville and television actor
 Enrique Chediak - cinematographer in Hollywood
 Camilo Coba - filmmaker
 Sebastián Cordero - film director/writer/editor
 Paola Farías - actress, model
 Katty García - actress
 Camilo Luzuriaga - film director/writer/producer
 Carolina Jaume - actress, TV host
 Mike Judge - Ecuadorian born American animator
 Jenn Pinto - actress; Ecuadorian/Puerto Rican American
 Michael Steger - actor
 Ricardo Hoyos - actor
 Priscilla Negrón - actress
 Flor María Palomeque - actress, model
 Albert Paulsen - actor
 Fatima Ptacek - actress and model 
 Diego Spotorno - actor, host
 Danilo Carrera - actor
 Juan Emilio Viguié - pioneering Puerto Rican movie producer (Ecuadorian mother)
 Marián Sabaté - TV personality. Born in Spain.

Music

 Adrianne León - singer-songwriter, American of Ecuadorian and Puerto Rican descent, lived in Ecuador.
 Adrienne Bailon - singer 3LW; Ecuadorian/Puerto Rican
 Antonio Neumane - French, lived and worked in Ecuador, composed the music of the National Anthem of Ecuador
 Arturo Rodas - classical composer
 Beatriz Parra Durango - classical musician
 Boris Cepeda - pianist
 Carlos Rubira Infante - singer-songwriter
 Celia Zaldumbide Rosales - pianist
 Christopher Velez - singer-songwriter and dancer (CNCO)
 Christina Aguilera - singer and pop icon (Half Ecuadorian, half German, Irish, Welsh, and Dutch ancestry)
 Diego Luzuriaga - composer
 Edgar Palacios Rodriguez - composer
 Enrique Espín Yépez - composer, violinist
 Fausto Miño - singer-songwriter
 Gabriela Villalba - singer
 Gerardo - singer
 Guillermo Ayoví Erazo, aka Papá Roncón - Afro-Ecuadorian musician, singer, and marimba player
 Isabel Rosales Pareja - pianist
 Jinsop - Korean/American singer, Ecuadorian nationality by naturalization
 Jorge Araujo Chiriboga - composer
 Jorge Saade - violinist
 Juan Fernando Velasco - singer-songwriter
 Carlota Jaramillo - singer
 Julio Jaramillo - folklore and romantic music singer
 Wendy Vera - singer, politician
 Leo Rojas - musician
 Leslie Wright - pianist
 Luis Humberto Salgado - classical composer
 Luis Silva Parra - saxophonist of classical jazz
 Mesias Maiguashca - classical composer
 Nicasio Safadi - songwriter, popular musician, born in Lebanon
 Paulina Aguirre - Christian singer
 Sebastian J. - music producer, songwriter
 Sixto María Durán Cárdenas - pianist, composer, lawyer, singer
 Lila Álvarez Garcia - pianist, choir director, and musical art teacher

Science
 Antonio de Alcedo - Spanish geographer and military leader, born in what is today Ecuador
 Eugenia Del Pino - developmental biologist
 Pedro Vicente Maldonado - geographer
 Clodoveo Carrión Mora - paleontologist and naturalist
 Misael Acosta Solís - naturalist
 William Jameson - physician, naturalist. Born in Scotland
 Augusto Nicolás Martínez - agronomist, geologist
 Plutarco Naranjo Vargas - doctor and scientific researcher
 Luis Sodiro - botanist, priest. Born in Italy.
 Presley Norton Yoder - archeologist

Medicine
 Eugenio Espejo (1747–1795) - physician, journalist, writer, philosopher
 Alejo Lascano Bahamonde  - physician, surgeon
 Rodrigo Fierro Benítez  - physician, researcher, writer
 Germán Abad Valenzuela - doctor, radiologist
 José Amén-Palma - surgeon and researcher

Politics and military
 Pamela Aguirre Zambonino (born 1984) – member of Andean Parliament
 Belisario Albán Mestanza (1853–1925) - notable role in the Liberal Revolution of Guayaquil
 Humberto Albornoz (1894-1959) - member of a provisional government junta in 1926
 Ana Lucía Armijos (born 1949) - first female interior minister
 Pedro José de Arteta (1797–1893) - vice-president
 Leopoldo Benites (1905–1996) - diplomat, writer, President of the United Nations General Assembly
 Diego Borja - Coordination Minister for Economic Policy, President of the Poder Ciudadano Movement
 Diana Coloma - Blind disability activist and politician
 Manuela Cañizares (1769–1814) - early leader of the independence movement
 Rafael Carvajal (1819–1878) - politician, minister
 Galo Chiriboga - minister, prosecutor, felon
 Pacífico Chiriboga (1810–1886) - politician, legislator, vicepresident
 Carlos Cueva Tamariz (1898–1991) - politician, senator, legislator, councilman to the city of Cuenca, Ambassador to UN, Secretary of Labor
 Alberto Dahik (born 1953) - vicepresident, professor and businessman
 Freddy Ehlers (born 1945) - journalist, minister, presidential candidate
 Juan Falconí Puig - public servant, diplomat
 Luis Félix López (1932–2008) - prominent politician, minister
 Manuel Félix López (1937–2004) - prominent politician in Manabí province
 Guillermo Franco (1811–1873) - self-proclaimed dictator, major figure in the Ecuadorian political and military scene
 Jorge Glas - vice-president, convicted felon
 Luisa Gómez de la Torre Páez (1887–1976) - socialist activist 
 Susana González Rosado (born 1973) - assembly member, viceprefect of Guayas Province
 Matilde Hidalgo (1889–1974) - activist, physician, first Ecuadorian woman to finish secondary education, first Ecuadorina woman to complete a degree in medicine and first Ecuadorian woman to cast a vote in a national election
 María Leonor Jiménez (born 1939) - candidate, public servant
 María Cristina Kronfle (born 1985) - member of the Constituent Assembly and National Assembly for Guayas Province
 José de La Mar - Independentist military leader, President of Peru (born in what is now Ecuador)
 Richelieu Levoyer - Army General, who proposed the "Return to the Constitution Plan" that ended the 1976–1979 dictatorship
 Guillaume Long - French-born minister
 Luis Macas - legislator, minister
 Federico Malo Andrade - governor, entrepreneur
 Eduardo Maruri - assembly Member for the Guayas Province
 Paco Moncayo - Army general, former Mayor of Quito, Congressman
 Debbie Mucarsel-Powell - Ecuadorian-born member of the United States House of Representatives, representing Florida. The first person born in South America to reach the United States Congress
 Jaime Nebot - political leader, major of Guayaquil
 Xavier Neira Menéndez - legislator, presidential candidate
 Nina Pacari - minister, congresswoman, indigenous activist
 Álvaro Noboa - millionaire, political leader, frequent presidential candidate
 Ricardo Paredes Romero - communist politician
 Antonio Parra Velasco - Ambassador to France and Great Britain
 Rodrigo Paz - mayor of Quito, minister, entrepreneur, sports executive
 Pedro Pinto Rubianes - minister, vice president
 Rafael Pólit - diplomat, governor
 León Roldós Aguilera - former Vice President of Ecuador, leader of the RED political movement
 Manuela Sáenz - involved in the independence movement, was Simón Bolívar's lover and confidant
 Jorge Salvador Lara - Ambassador to the Vatican, Peru, Chile, and France, former Foreign Minister of Ecuador
 Juan de Salinas y Zenitagoya - early independence leader
 José Serrano - president of the Legislature, minister
 Andrés Vallejo (born 1942) - prominent politician, president of the National Congress
 Luis Vargas Torres - (1844-1887), politician, guerrilla
 Alexandra Vela - minister, legislator
 Alfredo Vera Arrata - politician and architect, minister of education, councilman to the city of Quito, Anti-Corruption Secretary
 Alfredo Vera Vera (1910–1999), politician
 José de Villamil - a leader of the struggle for independence, considered the father of the Ecuadorian Navy. Born in Louisiana.

Indigenous leaders
 Atahualpa - Inca emperor, perhaps born in what is today Ecuador
 Rumiñawi - high-ranking Incan warrior around the time of the Spanish conquest

Presidents
 Juan José Flores - first President (1830–1835; 1839–1843; 1843–1845), Venezuelan-born
 Vicente Rocafuerte - President (1834–1839)
 José Joaquín de Olmedo - President (1845–1845)
 Vicente Ramón Roca - President (1845–1849), first Vice President (1830–1831)
 Manuel de Ascásubi - Interim president (1849-1850, 1869)
 Diego Noboa - President (1850–1851)
 José María Urvina - Supreme Chief and President (1851–1856)
 Francisco Robles - President (1856–1859)
 Gabriel García Moreno - President (1860–1865; 1869–1875)
 Jerónimo Carrión - President (1865–1867)
 Javier Espinosa - President (1868–1869)
 Antonio Borrero - President (1875–1876)
 Ignacio de Veintemilla - Dictator and president (1876–1883)
 José Plácido Caamaño - President (1883–1888)
 Antonio Flores Jijón - President (1888–1892)
 Luis Cordero Crespo - President (1892–1895)
 Vicente Lucio Salazar - President (1895)
 Eloy Alfaro - Supreme Chief and President (1895–1901)
 Leonidas Plaza - President (1901–1905; 1912–1916)
 Carlos Freile Zaldumbide - Interim president (1911–1912)
 Francisco Andrade Marín - Interim president (1912)
 Alfredo Baquerizo - President (1916–1920)
 José Luis Tamayo - President (1920-1924)
 Gonzalo Córdova - President (1924–1925)
 Isidro Ayora - President (1926–1931)
 Alberto Guerrero Martínez - Provisional president (1932)
 Juan de Dios Martínez - President (1932–1933)
 Abelardo Montalvo - President (1933–1934)
 José María Velasco Ibarra - President (1934–1935; 1944–1947; 1952–1956; 1968–1972)
 Federico Páez - Supreme Chief and President (1935-1937)
 Alberto Enríquez Gallo - Military dictator (1937-1938)
 Manuel María Borrero - Interim President (1938)
 Julio Enrique Moreno - Interim President (1940)
 Carlos Alberto Arroyo del Río - President (1940–1944)
 Carlos Mancheno Cajas - military dictator for a brief period (1947)
 Mariano Suárez - President for a brief period (1947)
 Galo Plaza Lasso - President (1948–1952)
 Camilo Ponce Enríquez - President (1956-1960)
 Carlos Julio Arosemena Monroy - President (1961–1963)
 Ramón Castro Jijón - President of the military junta (1963–1966)
 Otto Arosemena - President (1966–1968)
 Guillermo Rodríguez Lara - military dictator (1972–1976)
 Jaime Roldós Aguilera - President (1979–1981)
 Osvaldo Hurtado - President (1981–1984)
 Leon Febres Cordero - President (1984–1988)
 Rodrigo Borja Cevallos - President (1988–1992)
 Sixto Durán Ballén - President (1992–1996)
 Abdalá Bucaram - President (1996–1997), convicted felon
 Jamil Mahuad - President (1998–2000)
 Gustavo Noboa - President (2000–2003)
 Lucio Gutiérrez - President (2003–2005)
 Alfredo Palacio - President (2005–2007)
 Rafael Correa - President (2007–2017), convicted felon
 Lenin Moreno - President (2017–2021), former Vice President (2007–2013)
 Guillermo Lasso - President (2021–)

First ladies
 Mercedes Jijón - wife of Juan José Flores
 Corina del Parral - wife of José María Velasco Ibarra, born in Argentina
 Lucila Santos Trujillo - wife of Otto Arosemena
 María de Lourdes Alcívar - wife of Guillermo Lasso

Religious figures
 Carlos María de la Torre - cardinal
 Bernardino Echeverría Ruiz - archbishop of Guaaquil
 Leonidas Proaño - bishop of Riobamba
 José Mario Ruiz Navas - archbishop of Portoviejo
 Mariana de Jesús Torres - abbess of Conceptionist Monastery of Quito, Servant of God

Saints
 Mariana de Jesús de Paredes - mystic, saint
 Mercedes de Jesús Molina - mystic, blessed
 Miguel Febres Cordero - religious brother, saint
 Narcisa de Jesús - mystic, saint

Sports
 Álex Aguinaga - footballer and coach
 Jordy Alcívar - footballer
 Alexander Alvarado - footballer
 Nilson Angulo - footballer
 Rorys Aragón - footballer
 Robert Arboleda - footballer
 Samantha Arévalo - swimmer
 Xavier Arreaga - footballer
 Walter Ayoví - footballer
 Mimi Barona - surfer
 Christian Benítez - footballer
 Shirley Berruz - footballer
 Andrea Bonilla - long-distance runner
 Chico Borja - Ecuadorian-American footballer and coach
 Ramiro Borja - footballer, Ecuadorian-born, represented Puerto Rico internationally
 Elizabeth Bravo - triathlete
 Beder Caicedo - footballer
 Carina Caicedo - footballer
 Felipe Caicedo - footballer
 Jean Caicedo - boxer
 Jonathan Caicedo - cyclist
 Jordy Caicedo - footballer
 Moisés Caicedo - footballer
 Leonardo Campana - footballer
 Pablo Campana - tennis player and public servant
 Alfredo Campo - BMX cyclist
 Richard Carapaz - cyclist, winner of the Giro d'Italia, gold medal winner at the 2020 Olympics
 Byron Castillo - footballer
 Julio Castillo - boxer
 Miler Castillo (born 1987) - football player
 Jefferson Alveiro Cepeda - cyclist
 Rosa Chacha - long-distance runner
 Vanessa Chalá - judoka
 Andrés Chocho - race walker
 José Cifuentes - footballer
 Juan Manuel Correa - racing driver
 Neisi Dajomes - weightlifter, gold medal winner at the 2020 Olympics
 Daniela Darquea - golfer
 Ulises de la Cruz - footballer and politician
 Agustín Delgado - footballer and politician, scored first Ecuadorian goal in a World Cup
 Anicka Delgado - swimmer
 Diana Durango - sport shooter
 Iván Enderica Ochoa - swimmer
 Alexandra Escobar - weightlifter
 Gonzalo Escobar - tennis palyer
 Adriana Espinosa - archer
 Michael Estrada - footballer
 Pervis Estupiñán - footballer
 Alan Franco - footballer
 Hernán Galíndez - footballer (born in Argentina)
 Estefania García - judoka
 Fricson George - footballer
 Andrés Gómez - tennis player, French Open winner
 Emilio Gómez - tennis player
 Carlos Góngora - boxer, IBO world champion
 Doménica González - tennis player
 Carlos Gruezo Arboleda - footballer
 Carlos Gruezo Quiñónez - footballer
 Piero Hincapié - footballer
 Romario Ibarra - footballer
 Eduardo Hurtado - footballer
 Elías Jácome - football referee, the first Ecuadorian to officiate in a World Cup
 Karla Jaramillo - race walker
 Iván Kaviedes - footballer
 Fausto Klinger - footballer
 Martin Klinger - footballer
 Orly Klinger - footballer
 Nicolás Lapentti - tennis player
 Giovanni Lapentti - tennis player
 Juan Madruñero - footballer
 Ángel Mena - footballer
 Édison Méndez - footballer
 Sebas Méndez - footballer
 Alberto Miño - table tennis player
 Glenda Morejón - race walker
 Jhonatan Narváez - cyclist
 Christian Noboa - footballer
 Alfonso Obregón - footballer
 Joel Ordóñez - footballer
 Érika Pachito - boxer
 Joffre Pachito - footballer
 William Pacho - footballer
 Angie Palacios - weightlifter
 Diego Palacios - footballer
 Andrea Pérez Peña - sport shooter
 Jefferson Pérez - race walker, gold medal winner of the 20 km race walk at the 1996 Olympics
 Paola Pérez - race walker
 Tomas Peribonio - swimmer
 Brian Pintado - race walker
 Gonzalo Plata - footballer
 Joao Plata - footballer
 Jackson Porozo - footballer
 Angelo Preciado - footballer
 Ayrton Preciado - footballer
 Lenin Preciado - judoka
 Álex Quiñónez - sprinter
 Roberto Quiroz - tennis player
 Cristian Ramírez - footballer
 Djorkaeff Reasco - footballer
 Kevin Rodríguez - footballer
 Tamara Salazar - weightlifter, medalist at the 2020 Summer Olympics
 Jeremy Sarmiento - footballer, born in Spain
 Hugo Savinovich - professional wrestler in the United States and Puerto Rico
 Pancho Segura - Ecuadorian-American tennis player, among the top players in his generation
 Alberto Spencer - footballer, best remembered for his time at Peñarol. Top all-time Copa Libertadores scorer.
 Abraham Suárez - diver 
 Nelson Suarez - diver 
 Ángela Tenorio - sprinter
 Carlos Tenorio - footballer
 Félix Torres - footballer
 Patricio Urrutia - footballer and politician, captained the successful L.D.U. Quito team which won Copa Libertadores
 Anthony Valencia - footballer
 Antonio Valencia - footballer, best known for his time at Manchester United F.C., only Manchester United captain from outside Europe
 Enner Valencia - footballer
 Joel Valencia - footballer, has also represented Spain on youth levels
 Iván Vallejo - mountaineer and public servant
 Luisa Valverde - freestyle wrestler
 Marlon Vera - Mixed martial arts fighter
 Rolando Vera - long-distance runner
 Claudio Villanueva - race walker
 Petter Villegas - footballer, Ecuadorian-born, represented Puerto Rico internationally
 Nicolas Wettstein - eventing rider (born in Switzerland, represented Ecuador internationally)
 Lucía Yépez - wrestler
 Octavio Zambrano - football coach, known mostly for his career at Major League Soccer

Other
 Lorena Bobbitt, Ecuadorian-American woman made famous after assaulting her husband.
 María Capovilla, supercentenarian, at one time the oldest living person in the world
 Mariana Carcelén, aristocrat, Marchioness, wife of independence leader Antonio José de Sucre and as such First Lady of Bolivia.
 Martina Carrillo, 18th-century anti-slavery activist
 Blanca Chancoso, indigenous activist
 Magdalena Dávalos y Maldonado, aristocrat, intellectual, patron of the arts
 Jacinto Jijón y Caamaño, aristocrat, archaeologist, politician
 Yolanda Kakabadse, environmentalist activist
 Hortensia Mata, socialite and philanthropist
 Manuel Muñoz Borrero, diplomat, considered Righteous Among the Nations for his role in saving Jewish people during the Holocaust
 Faustino Rayo, Colombian-born merchant and assassin, known for murdering Gabriel García Moreno
 Nelson Serrano, Ecuadorian-American businessman convicted of murder